

Bats (Chiroptera)

Vesper bats (Vespertilionidae) 

Fringed myotis (Myotis thysanodes) 
Long-eared myotis (Myotis evotis) 
Northern long-eared myotis (Myotis septentrionalis) 
California myotis (Myotis californicus) 
Little brown bat (Myotis lucifugus) 
Western small-footed bat (Myotis ciliolabrum) 
Yuma myotis (Myotis yumanensis) 
Long-legged myotis (Myotis volans) 
Desert red bat (Lasiurus blossevillii) 
Hoary bat (Lasiurus cinereus) 
Silver-haired bat (Lasionycteris noctivagans) 
Big brown bat (Eptesicus fuscus) 
Spotted bat (Euderma maculatum) 
Pallid bat (Antrozous pallidus) 
Townsend's big-eared bat (Corynorhinus townsendii)

Carnivores (Carnivora)

Bears (Ursidae) 
Black bear (Ursus americanus)  
Brown bear (Ursus arctos) 
Grizzly bear (Ursus arctos horribilis)

Raccoons (Procyonidae) 

Common raccoon (Procyon lotor)

Skunks (Mephitidae)
Western spotted skunk (Spilogale gracilis) 
Striped skunk (Mephitis mephitis)

Mustelids (Mustelidae) 
Sea otter (Enhydra lutris) 
Wolverine (Gulo gulo) 
North American river otter (Lontra canadensis) 
American marten (Martes americana) 
Pacific marten (Martes caurina) 
Haida ermine (Mustela haidarum) 
Least weasel (Mustela nivalis) 
American ermine (Mustela richardsonii) 
Long-tailed weasel (Neogale frenata) 
American mink (Neogale vison) 
Fisher (Pekania pennanti) 
American badger (Taxidea taxus)

Felids (Felidae) 

Bobcat (Lynx rufus) 
Canada lynx (Lynx canadensis) 
Cougar (Puma concolor)

Canids (Canidae) 

 

Coyote (Canis latrans) 
Grey wolf (Canis lupus) 
Red fox (Vulpes vulpes)

Earless seals (Phocidae) 
Harbor seal (Phoca vitulina) 
Northern elephant seal (Mirounga angustirostris)

Eared seals (Otariidae) 

Northern fur seal (Callorhinus ursinus) 
Steller sea lion (Eumetopias jubatus) 
California sea lion (Zalophus californianus)

Even-toed ungulates (Artiodactyla)

Deer (Cervidae) 
Moose (Alces alces) 
Elk (Cervus canadensis) 
European fallow deer (Dama dama) introduced 
Mule deer (Odocoileus hemionus) 
White-tailed deer (Odocoileus virginianus) 
Caribou (Rangifer tarandus)

Bovids (Bovidae) 

American bison (Bison bison) 
Mountain goat (Oreamnos americanus) 
Bighorn sheep (Ovis canadensis) 
Dall sheep (Ovis dalli)

Rodents (Rodentia)

Beavers (Castoridae) 

North American beaver (Castor canadensis)

New World porcupines (Erethizontidae) 
North American porcupine (Erethizon dorsatum)

Dipodids (Dipodidae) 
Meadow jumping mouse (Zapus hudsonius) 
Western jumping mouse (Zapus princeps) 
Pacific jumping mouse (Zapus trinotatus)

Cricetidae 

Western harvest mouse (Reithrodontomys megalotis) 
Bushy-tailed woodrat (Neotoma cinerea) 
Northwestern deer mouse (Peromyscus keeni) 
Western deer mouse (Peromyscus sonoriensis) 
Southern red-backed vole (Myodes gapperi) 
Northern red-backed vole (Myodes rutilus) 
Western heather vole (Phenacomys intermedius) 
Eastern heather vole (Phenacomys ungava) 
Water vole (Microtus richardsoni) 
Meadow vole (Microtus pennsylvanicus) 
Montane vole (Microtus montanus) 
Townsend's vole (Microtus townsendii) 
Tundra vole (Microtus oeconomus) 
Long-tailed vole (Microtus longicaudus) 
Creeping vole (Microtus oregoni) 
Muskrat (Ondatra zibethicus) 
Siberian brown lemming (Lemmus sibiricus) 
Northern bog lemming (Synaptomys borealis)

Muridae 

Black rat (Rattus rattus) 
Brown rat (Rattus norvegicus) 
House mouse (Mus musculus)

Heteromyidae 
Great Basin pocket mouse (Perognathus parvus)

Pocket gophers (Geomyidae) 
Northern pocket gopher (Thomomys talpoides)

Squirrels (Sciuridae) 

Yellow-pine chipmunk (Tamias amoenus) 
Least chipmunk (Tamias minimus) 
Red-tailed chipmunk (Tamias ruficaudus) 
Townsend's chipmunk (Tamias townsendii) 
Groundhog (Marmota monax) 
Yellow-bellied marmot (Marmota flaviventris) 
Hoary marmot (Marmota caligata) 
Vancouver Island marmot (Marmota vancouverensis) 
Columbian ground squirrel (Spermophilus columbianus) 
Arctic ground squirrel (Spermophilus parryii) 
Cascade golden-mantled ground squirrel (Spermophilus saturatus) 
Golden-mantled ground squirrel (Spermophilus lateralis) 
Eastern grey squirrel (Sciurus carolinensis) 
Fox squirrel (Sciurus niger) 
Douglas squirrel (Tamiasciurus douglasii) 
American red squirrel (Tamiasciurus hudsonicus) 
Northern flying squirrel (Glaucomys sabrinus) 
Humboldt's flying squirrel (Glaucomys oregonensis)

Aplodontiidae 
Mountain beaver (Aplodontia rufa)

Lagomorpha

Leporidae 

Mountain cottontail (Sylvilagus nuttallii) 
European rabbit (Oryctolagus cuniculus)  introduced
Snowshoe hare (Lepus americanus) 
White-tailed jackrabbit (Lepus townsendii)

Pikas (Ochotonidae) 
Collared pika (Ochotona collaris) 
American pika (Ochotona princeps)

Soricomorpha

Talpidae 
Townsend's mole (Scapanus townsendii) 
Coast mole (Scapanus orarius)

Shrews (Soricidae) 

Cinereus shrew (Sorex cinereus)  
Preble's shrew (Sorex preblei) 
Vagrant shrew (Sorex vagrans) 
Western water shrew (Sorex navigator) 
American water shrew (Sorex palustris) 
Pacific water shrew (Sorex bendirii) 
Arctic shrew (Sorex arcticus) 
American pygmy shrew (Sorex hoyi) 
Tundra shrew (Sorex tundrensis) 
Trowbridge's shrew (Sorex trowbridgii) 
Merriam's shrew (Sorex merriami) 
Dusky shrew (Sorex monticolus; formerly Sorex obscurus) 
Olympic shrew (Sorex rohweri)

Whales (Cetacea)

Oceanic dolphins (Delphinidae) 
Short-beaked common dolphin (Delphinus delphis) 
Short-finned pilot whale (Globicephala macrorhynchus) 
Risso's dolphin (Grampus griseus) 
Northern right whale dolphin (Lissodelphis borealis) 
Pacific white-sided dolphin (Sagmatias obliquidens) 
Orca (Orcinus orca) 
False killer whale (Pseudorca crassidens) 
Striped dolphin (Stenella coeruleoalba)

Porpoises (Phocoenidae) 
Harbour porpoise (Phocoena phocoena) 
Dall's porpoise (Phocoenoides dalli)

Sperm whales (Balaenopteridae) 
Sperm whale (Physeter macrocephalus)

Dwarf sperm whales (Kogiidae) 
Pygmy sperm whale (Kogia breviceps) 
Dwarf sperm whale (Kogia sima)

Beaked whales (Ziphiidae) 
Baird's beaked whale (Berardius bairdii) 
Hubbs' beaked whale (Mesoplodon carlhubbsi) 
Stejneger's beaked whale (Mesoplodon stejnegeri) 
Cuvier's beaked whale (Ziphius cavirostris)

Rorquals (Balaenopteridae) 
Common minke whale (Balaenoptera acutorostrata) 
Sei whale (Balaenoptera borealis) 
Blue whale (Balaenoptera musculus) 
Fin whale (Balaenoptera physalus) 
Humpback whale (Megaptera novaeangliae) 
Grey whale (Eschrichtius robustus)

See also
Fauna of Canada
Lists of mammals by region
List of mammals of Canada

References

Mammals
British Columbia